The Crime Smasher is a 1943 American crime comedy film directed by James Tinling and starring Edgar Kennedy, Richard Cromwell and Gale Storm. It is based on the  Radio program Cosmo Jones featuring Frank Graham. The film's sets were designed by the art director Dave Milton. It is sometimes alternatively titled Cosmo Jones in the Crime Smasher.

Cast 
Edgar Kennedy as Police Chief Murphy
Richard Cromwell as Sgt. Pat Flanagan
Gale Storm as Susan Fleming
Mantan Moreland as Eustace Smith
Frank Graham as Professor Cosmo Jones
Gwen Kenyon as Phyllis Blake
Herbert Rawlinson as Mr. James J. Blake
Tristram Coffin as Jake Pelotti
Charles Jordan as Biff Garr
Vince Barnett as Henchman "Gimp"
Emmett Vogan as Police Commissioner Gould
Maxine Leslie as Mrs. Jake Pelotti
Mauritz Hugo as Tony Sandol - Gangster
Sam Bernard as Gangster

References

Bibliography
 Tucker, David C. Gale Storm: A Biography and Career Record. McFarland,  2018.

External links 

1943 films
1943 romantic drama films
American mystery films
1943 crime drama films
1940s English-language films
American black-and-white films
Monogram Pictures films
American crime drama films
American romantic drama films
Films directed by James Tinling
1940s American films